Johann Peter Theodor Janssen (12 December 1844, Düsseldorf – 19 February 1908, Düsseldorf) was a German historical painter.

Biography
Janssen was born in Düsseldorf, son of the engraver  (1817–1894), by whom he was first instructed before studying at the Academy under Karl Sohn and Bendemann. He is principally known through a series of decorative works whose monumental style and sound naturalism won him a reputation as one of the foremost historical painters of his time. He became professor at the Düsseldorf Academy in 1877 and its director in 1895, and was elected a member of the Prussian Academy of Arts in 1885. In Berlin, he worked also for Emil Hünten. His more important mural paintings include:
 "The Colonization of the Baltic Coast" (1872), in the exchange at Bremen
 "The Myth of Promethus," in 12 compositions, in the second Cornelius Room of the National Gallery in Berlin
 "Seven Momentous Episodes in the History of Erfurt" (1882), Town Hall, Erfurt
 "Human Life," "Imagination," "Beauty," and "Nature," in the Aula of the Düsseldorf Academy

Of his oil paintings, the "Denial of Peter" is in the Academy at Philadelphia; the "Infancy of Bacchus" (1882) excited great admiration at the International Exhibition in Munich; and "Walther Dodde and the Peasants of Berg before the Battle of Worringen, 1288" (Düsseldorf Gallery), a composition of great dramatic power, containing many life-size figures, was awarded the great  gold medal in Berlin in 1893.

He was the brother of sculptor Karl Janssen whose works include the monument to the Kaiser at Düsseldorf, and "Woman Hewing Stone," in the National Gallery, Berlin.

Selected paintings

References

External links 

 Homepage about (Johann) Peter (Theodor) Janssen 1844 - 1908 

19th-century German painters
19th-century German male artists
German male painters
20th-century German painters
20th-century German male artists
1844 births
1908 deaths
Kunstakademie Düsseldorf alumni
Academic staff of Kunstakademie Düsseldorf
History painters
Artists from Düsseldorf